The third season of the animated television series BoJack Horseman premiered on Netflix on July 22, 2016. The season consists of 12 episodes.

Cast and characters

Main 
 Will Arnett as BoJack Horseman
 Amy Sedaris as Princess Carolyn
 Alison Brie as Diane Nguyen
 Paul F. Tompkins as Mr. Peanutbutter
 Aaron Paul as Todd Chavez

Recurring

Guest stars

Episodes

Reception
On the review aggregator Rotten Tomatoes, the season holds an approval rating of 100% based on 23 reviews, with an average rating of 9.2/10. The site's critical consensus reads, "Skillfully puncturing the idea of celebrity and our culture's bizarre obsession with it, BoJack Horsemans third season continues its streak as one of the funniest and most heartbreaking shows on television." On Metacritic, the season received a score of 89 out of 100, based on 12 reviews, indicating "universal acclaim".

Daniel Fienberg of The Hollywood Reporter praised the season, saying: "The title 'Best Show on TV' is one that I like to bestow actively based on which series are and aren't currently on-air—and as of the Friday's premiere of 12 new episodes, it's possible that BoJack Horseman will hold the title, at least for a little while." Sonia Saraiya of Variety also praised the season, but admitted that this third season wasn't as strong as the second, saying "The third season isn't quite what the second season was. In some ways, that's a shame: The second season had a tight arc that both deployed some fantastic storytelling and demonstrated the show's myriad abilities. The third season isn't nearly so neatly constructed; the end of the season feels less like a conclusion and more like a plateau. But without the smooth lines of deliberate plotting, the show is able to find some really brilliant sweet spots." Liz Shannon Miller of Indiewire gave the season an "A", saying: "Many Season 3 episodes are definable in simple terms ... they actually function as stand-alone on a level that you honestly don't see too often ... this leads to some jaw-dropping installments, which iris in on character on levels that range from hilarious to heartbreaking."

The fourth episode, "Fish Out of Water," received critical acclaim and has largely been considered the highlight of the season. Bojack's production designer Lisa Hanawalt talked about the episode in an interview with Vox, stating: "I'm so delighted with what we were able to do ... everyone [on the show] knew it was our Fantasia. Daniel D'Addario of Time magazine called "Fish Out of Water" the best television episode of 2016, stating, "This episode is dazzingly beautiful and among the most creative single episodes of TV in memory; it's also a perceptive and painful look at being forced to confront one's regrets." Jesse David Fox of Vulture.com also called this episode one of the best of 2016, saying the episode "plays out as if the iconic Looney Tunes director Chuck Jones were tasked with doing a Charlie Chaplin–inspired Fantasia segment ... tonally and formally inventive, silly and bittersweet, visually and sonically beautiful: It's a much-watch, and the best part is, you don't have to have watched a single other episode of the series to love it." Les Chappell of The A.V. Club gave the episode an "A", stating: "This episode is nothing short of a masterpiece, a culmination of both BoJack Horseman's unique animation style and its views on isolation and connection. Taken as part of the whole it could very well be the best episode that the show has ever done, and taken on its own it's a hauntingly beautiful story of being a stranger in a strange land. It finds the lowest possible geographic point to take its main character, and from that place it ascends to the highest point the series has ever reached."

This season's look at depression was also praised. Show creator Raphael Bob-Waksberg, in an interview with HuffPost, explained that for the series, "It was never our top priority to be the voice of depression ... [Bojack Horseman is not] trying to capture this thing [depression] as much as it is trying to capture this character and what he is." Regardless, Maxwell Strachan of HuffPost considers this season, and the show as a whole, to be one of the very few shows that accurately depicts the mental illness, saying "Outside of a handful of series, depictions of depression in Hollywood have historically felt one-dimensional, as if writers Googled 'depression' and decided it meant 'sad.' In BoJack, we finally have a fully formed character that deals with depression in all its forms, too. We see BoJack suffocating as he grapples with the idea that he will never reach his own definition of greatness, that it is too late to turn his life around, that his best days are behind him and his worst ones ahead. It's not pretty, but it can be soothing to see someone who relates, even if that someone is a drunk horse with a temper." Strachan further explains: "For a brief moment, it feels as if BoJack has finally had a revelation that could last―that he will stop his self-destructive ways, learn to prioritize the people he cares about and beat his depression forever. But soon enough, BoJack is back in the pit of despair, hating himself and hurting the people around him. It's a sad, familiar cycle. It's also what makes the show so good. 'BoJack Horseman' doesn't excuse bad behavior. But it certainly can help those who are struggling with the depression that can cause that bad behavior to feel less alone."

References

2016 American television seasons
BoJack Horseman seasons